Jamie Michael Colin Waylett (born 21 July 1989) is a British former actor. His only film role to date is that of Vincent Crabbe in six of the eight Harry Potter films. In 2012, he was imprisoned for two years for his participation in the 2011 England riots.

Early life
Waylett was born in Kilburn, London, the fifth of six children born to Alan Waylett (born 1958) and Theresa Waylett (née De Freitas, born 1958). He lives in Camden, London. At the age of nine, he was hit by a car; he was expected to die or suffer severe brain damage, but surprised doctors by recovering full mental faculties.

Career
While Waylett was a student at Emmanuel Primary School, his photograph was taken as part of a general auditioning process for the Harry Potter films. Initially considered for the part of Dudley Dursley, he was cast as Vincent Crabbe after an audition in front of director Chris Columbus. 

In August 2009, his Harry Potter co-star Joshua Herdman announced that Waylett would not return for Harry Potter and the Deathly Hallows – Part 1, or for the final film in the series, Harry Potter and the Deathly Hallows – Part 2.

Legal issues

On 7 April 2009, Waylett and a friend were pulled over by police. The officers then searched their vehicle, finding a knife and eight bags of cannabis. Images on a camera led police to Waylett's mother's house, where additional cannabis plants were discovered being grown. Waylett was charged a month later for possession of the drug. He appeared in court on 16 July and pleaded guilty to growing the plants in his mother's home, but claimed that they were for his personal use and not for distribution. On 21 July, he was sentenced to 120 hours of community service. He had previously been accused of using cocaine in October 2006.

On 14 October 2011, Waylett was arrested for his participation in the August London riots. The Metropolitan Police charged him with "violent disorder, having an article with intent to destroy or damage property, and receiving stolen goods". He was specifically accused of possessing a Molotov cocktail while looting a chemist's (pharmacy) in Chalk Farm, London. He was also charged with growing cannabis after police found fifteen plants during a search of his home. On 20 March 2012, he was sentenced to two years in prison for taking part in the riots.

Filmography

Film

Television

Video games

References

External links
 
 

1989 births
Living people
People from Kilburn, London
Male actors from London
English male film actors
2011 England riots
English people convicted of drug offences
21st-century English criminals
21st-century English male actors
English male child actors
Prisoners and detainees of England and Wales